Boil That Dust Speck is the second studio album by Mike Keneally.

Track listing
All tracks composed by Mike Keneally.

 "Sooth" (2:30)
 "'Cause of Breakfast" (5:08)
 "The Desired Effect" (3:34)
 "Skunk" (2:42)
 "I'm Glad There's Lemon-Freshened Thorax in You" (0:09)
 "Top of Stove Melting" (2:42)
 "Aglow" (2:49)
 "Bryan Beller's Favorite Song" (0:21)
 "Deep-Fried Skinks Are Go" (0:31)
 "Good Morning, Sometime" (1:40)
 "Them Dolphins Is Smart" (0:59)
 "1988 Was a Million Years Ago" (3:32)
 "Yep, Them Dolphins Is Smart, Alright" (1:59)
 "Bullys (sic)" (5:57)
 "My Dilemma" (4:02)
 "Helen Was Brash" (1:13)
 "Weekend" (3:55)
 "Land of Broken Dreams" (2:28)
 "Blameless (The Floating Face)" (2:15)
 "That Claim-Jumping Swine, O'Bannon" (1:06)
 "Faithful Axe" (1:26)
 "Natty Trousers" (2:27)
 "Scotch" (3:47)
 "There Have Been Bad Moments" (4:43)
 "Frang Tang, The Valentine Bear" (1:53)
 "I Will" (0:44)
 "In the Bone World" (2:33)
 "The Old Boat Guy, Part One" (2:27)
 "The Old Boat Guy, Part Two" (2:04)
 "The Old Boat Guy, Part Three" (2:48)

References
https://web.archive.org/web/20120809070301/http://www.keneally.com/discography/mksolorecords.html#boil

1994 albums
Mike Keneally albums